Li-Chyong Chen is a Taiwanese physicist.

Career 
Chen completed her bachelor's of science degree in physics at National Taiwan University between 1977 and 1981. She then attended Harvard University from 1983 to 1989, where she earned a doctorate in applied physics. Chen returned to Taiwan in 1994, and is a professor of physics at National Taiwan University.

In 2022 she was elected to the Academia Sinica.

Personal life 
She is married to Chen Kuei-hsien, a physicist who works for Academia Sinica's Institute of Atomic and Molecular Sciences.

References

Academic staff of the National Taiwan University
Members of Academia Sinica
20th-century Taiwanese physicists
21st-century Taiwanese physicists
Taiwanese women physicists
National Taiwan University alumni
Harvard University alumni
Living people
Year of birth missing (living people)
Taiwanese expatriates in the United States